The Spindrift 13 is a Canadian sailing dinghy that was designed by Hubert Vandestadt and first built in 1965.

Production
The boat was produced as a kit and in completed form of fibreglass, plus could be built from scratch from wood.

The design was built by Vandestadt and McGruer Limited in Owen Sound, Ontario, Canada as its first product. There were 800 boats completed starting in 1965, but the company went out of business in 1987 and the boat is now out of production.

Design
The Spindrift 13 is a recreational sailboat, with the manufactured boats built predominantly of fibreglass, with the deck made as a foam sandwich. It has a fractional sloop rig, a raked stem, a plumb transom, a transom-hung rudder controlled by a tiller and a retractable centreboard. Both the rudder and centreboard are "kick up" designs. For safety the design has fore and aft buoyancy tanks and a foam-filled mast. The boat displaces  and is equipped with a boom vang and jiffy reefing. A spinnaker of  can be fitted.

The design has a capacity of four people, but is raced with a crew of two.

The design has a Portsmouth Yardstick sailing handicap of 103.6.

See also
List of sailing boat types

References

Dinghies
1960s sailboat type designs
Sailboat type designs by Hubert Vandestadt
Sailboat types built by Vandestadt and McGruer Limited